Hajo Assembly constituency is one of the 126 assembly constituencies of  Assam a north east state of India.  Hajo is also part of Gauhati Lok Sabha constituency.

Members of Legislative Assembly
 1951: Bishnuram Medhi, Indian National Congress
 1957: Bishnuram Medhi, Indian National Congress
 1958 (by elections): Mahendra Mohan Choudhury, Indian National Congress
 1962: Mahendra Mohan Choudhury, Indian National Congress
 1967: Bishnuram Medhi, Indian National Congress
 1978: Rabindra Nath Malakar, Janata Party
 1983: Barkatullah, Indian National Congress
 1985: Kamakhya Charan Choudhury, Independent
 1991: Badan Baruah, Natun Asom Gana Parishad
 1996: Nurul Hussain Asom Gana Parishad
 2001: Dr. Haren Das, Indian National Congress
 2006: Nurul Hussain Asom Gana Parishad
 2011: Dwipen Pathak, All India Trinamool Congress
 2016: Suman Haripriya, Bharatiya Janata Party
 2021: Suman Haripriya, Bharatiya Janata Party

Election results

2016 results

2011 result

2006 result

See also
 Kamrup district
 List of constituencies of Assam Legislative Assembly

References

External links 
 

Assembly constituencies of Assam
Kamrup district